Andrew Alexander Kiwomya (born 20 May 1996) is an English professional footballer who plays as a winger and forward for Stafford Rangers.

Early and personal life
Kiwomya was born on 20 May 1996 in Sheffield. He attended Notre Dame High School, Sheffield before joining Chelsea's Youth Academy. He is the son of former professional footballer Andy Kiwomya and the nephew of Chris Kiwomya. He had been a junior athletics champion in the 100m; at the age of 14 he ran the event in 10.98 seconds.

Kiwomya is of English, Jamaican, Ugandan, and Scottish heritage.

Kiwomya was diagnosed with Guillain-Barré syndrome in 2017.

Kiwomya and his girlfriend, Talitha Minnis of Ex on the Beach, have a son born in January 2016.

Club career

Chelsea
Kiwomya moved from Rotherham United to Chelsea in 2010. After his move to Chelsea, Kiwomya featured in the Under-18s, Under-19s and Under-21s squads.

Although Kiwomya did not play a part in the UEFA Youth League final, Kiwomya collected a winner's medal and celebrated with his teammates for his contributions during the group stage.

In July 2016, Kiwomya signed a one-year extension, staying with the London side until June 2017.

Loan spells

He signed a one-month loan deal with Barnsley in January 2015. He was seen as a replacement for Devante Cole, who returned to parent club Manchester City following the expiry of his loan spell. Kiwomya made his senior professional debut with Barnsley, playing 77 minutes in a 2–0 home victory over Yeovil Town. Kiwomya's father Andy had also started career with Barnsley. On 3 February 2015, Barnsley extended Kiwomya's loan deal for a further month, until 3 March 2015. 
He returned to Chelsea after failing to impress with Barnsley.

On 21 January 2016, Kiwomya joined League One side Fleetwood Town on a one-month loan deal until 20 February 2016. On 23 January 2016, Kiwomya made his debut coming off the bench, replacing David Henen against Doncaster Rovers. On 23 February 2016, Fleetwood decided not to extend his loan and sent him back to his parent-team, Chelsea, after only making four appearances.

On 20 July 2016, Kiwomya joined League Two side Crewe Alexandra on loan until 9 January 2017. On 6 August 2016, Kiwomya made his Crewe debut, replacing George Cooper in the 62nd minute and scoring the second goal in a 2–1 win at Stevenage. On 16 August, Kiwomya made his first start, against Hartlepool United, setting up the first goal and scoring the second in a 3–3 draw. In September 2016, Kiwomya was nominated for Sky Bet League Two Player of the Month award. Kiwomya suffered a dislocated shoulder in a match against Grimsby Town on 17 September; the injury did not require surgery, with Kiwomya due to return to regular training in October. After returning from injury, Crewe's manager Steve Davis said he had approached Chelsea about extending Kiwomya's loan period beyond January 2017, and the loan was extended to the end of the season on 9 January 2017. On 9 May 2017, Crewe announced that Kiwomya would be returning to his parent club.

Doncaster Rovers
After having tried to sign him during the previous season, on 16 June 2017 it was announced that Kiwomya had joined Doncaster Rovers on a three-year deal. Kiwomya was diagnosed with Guillain-Barré syndrome in 2017.

In October 2018, he joined Chesterfield on loan.

He was transfer-listed by Doncaster at the end of the 2018–19 season. He moved on loan to Chorley in February 2020 for a month.

He was released by Doncaster at the end of the 2019–20 season.

Non-league
After a trial with Turkish club Fatih Karagümrük, Kiwomya re-signed for Chesterfield, on a permanent basis in October 2020. On 12 December 2020, it was announced that Kiwomya had been released by Chesterfield.

On 5 January 2021 he signed for King's Lynn Town. On 4 June 2021 it was announced that he would be released from the club at the end of the season.

Gibraltar
In November 2021 Kiwomya moved abroad for the first time, signing for Gibraltar National League side Bruno's Magpies. He made his debut on 20 November, coming on as a substitute in a 3–2 win over Lions Gibraltar.

Return to non-league
On 4 March 2022, Kiwomya signed for Macclesfield. He then signed for Stafford Rangers.

International career
Kiwomya has represented England at under-16, under-17, under-18, and under-19 levels.

Playing style
Kiwomya was described by Chelsea as "a pacey player who mostly operates as a winger but can play as a central striker", and as "an exciting striker with electric pace."

Career statistics

Honours

Club
Chelsea Reserves
 FA Youth Cup: 2011–12, 2013–14
 Professional Development League: 2013–14
 UEFA Youth League: 2014–15

Macclesfield
 NWCFL Premier Division: 2021–22

International
England U16
 Victory Shield : 2012

References

External links
 England profile at The FA

1996 births
Living people
English footballers
Rotherham United F.C. players
Chelsea F.C. players
Barnsley F.C. players
Fleetwood Town F.C. players
Crewe Alexandra F.C. players
Doncaster Rovers F.C. players
Chesterfield F.C. players
Chorley F.C. players
King's Lynn Town F.C. players
English Football League players
Association football wingers
Association football forwards
England youth international footballers
People educated at Notre Dame High School, Sheffield
English people of Ugandan descent
English people of Scottish descent
English people of Jamaican descent
National League (English football) players
People with Guillain–Barré syndrome
F.C. Bruno's Magpies players
English expatriate footballers
English expatriates in Gibraltar
Expatriate footballers in Gibraltar
Gibraltar National League players
Macclesfield F.C. players
Stafford Rangers F.C. players